Eden Park railway station serves Eden Park in the London Borough of Bromley in south east London, in Travelcard Zone 5. It is therefore possible to use an Oyster card at the station. The station and all trains serving it is operated by Southeastern on the Hayes line. The trains are electric, powered by a third rail.

Opened in 1882 by the South Eastern Railway, it is the first station along the branch line from Elmers End to Hayes and still has most of its original wooden buildings, surviving an arson attempt by the suffragettes in 1913 and a partial rebuilding in 1922.

History

Early years (1882–1923)
Eden Park was built when the branch from the Mid-Kent Railway at Elmers End to Hayes was built and opened on 29 May 1882.

The branch was built by the West Wickham & Hayes Railway, but was sold to the South Eastern Railway in 1881 for £162,000. Colonel John Farnaby, Lord of the Manor of West Wickham, was a leading promoter. Initially the 13 weekday and four Sunday services operated as far as Elmers End where they connected with Addiscombe to London trains. Eden Park was the first station located on the branch and from opening was provided with two platforms. The station building was (and is) built in the SER clapboard style with a slate roof and is located on the down side with a small shelter being located on the up. The station was named Eden Park after the estate of William R Mace who had insisted the station be provided on condition for use of his land. A signal box was provided at the Hayes end of the station .

Initially the line was of questionable commercial value as the area was largely rural although it was an attractive location for Londoners wishing to escape to the countryside.

In 1898 the South Eastern Railway and the London Chatham and Dover Railway agreed to work as one railway company under the name of the South Eastern and Chatham Railway and thus Eden Park became a SE&CR station.

The signal box was closed in 1899.

By 1912 services had increased to 15 each way but only two of these actually operated through to London the rest terminating at Elmers End. In 1909 the 8:37 a.m. Hayes - Charing Cross service was formed of Continental boat train stock where on arrival it was used to work the 10:00 a.m. Charing Cross - Folkestone boat train.

On 14 June 1913 members of the Suffragettes movement planted a bomb which was discovered in the ladies waiting room at the station. The clock-work mechanism had stopped working and so it failed to go off. This event followed the death of Emily Wilding Davison six days earlier after her attempt to stop the King's horse at the Epsom Derby.

Southern Railway (1923–1947)
Following the Railways Act 1921 (also known as the Grouping Act), Eden Park became a Southern Railway station on 1 January 1923.

The line was electrified with limited electric services commencing on 21 September 1925 before a full electric service started operation on 28 February 1926. Following the electrification house building started to increase in the area and as a result so did patronage of the station. In 1925, 61 season tickets were sold but nine years later this had increased to 4,188. Similarly, 7,000 tickets were issued in 1925 but in 1934 that had risen to 75,000 tickets per year.
Between 1929 and 1930 a trailing siding from the up line on the east side of the station was in use in conjunction with the construction of the Monks Orchard (Bethlem Royal) Hospital in Shirley.

British Railways (1948–1994)
On 1 January 1948 following nationalisation of the railways Eden Park became part of British Railways Southern Region.

Upon sectorisation in 1982, three passenger sectors were created: InterCity, operating principal express services; and London & South East (renamed Network SouthEast in 1986) who operated commuter services in the London area.

Privatisation era (1994–present)

Following privatisation of British Rail on 1 April 1994 the infrastructure at Eden Park station became the responsibility of Railtrack whilst a business unit operated the train services. On 13 October 1996 operation of the passenger services passed to Connex South Eastern who were originally due to run the franchise until 2011.

Following a number of accidents and financial issues Railtrack plc was sold to Network Rail on 3 October 2002 who became responsible for the infrastructure.

On 27 June 2003 the Strategic Rail Authority decided to strip Connex of the franchise citing poor financial management and run the franchise itself. Connex South Eastern continued to operate the franchise until 8 November 2003 with the services transferring to the Strategic Rail Authority's South Eastern Trains subsidiary the following day.

On 30 November 2005 the Department for Transport awarded Govia the Integrated Kent franchise. The services operated by South Eastern Trains transferred to Southeastern on 1 April 2006. On 21 January 2016, Transport for London announced that in 2018, they will take over the London suburban parts of the Southeastern franchise, rebranding the routes as London Overground from that point.

During the late 1990s, the platform walls were painted by local graffiti artists Mesa and Aztek; the work has since been removed.

A blind man fell from the platform and was killed by a train on 26 February 2020; a February 2021 report by the Rail Accident Investigation Branch attributed his death to tactile paving not having been installed at the platform edge.

Services 

The typical off-peak service in trains per hour is:
 4 tph to 

On Sundays, the station is served by a half-hourly service between Hayes and London Charing Cross via Lewisham.

Layout

Connections
London Buses routes 194, 356 and 358 serve the station.

References

External links 

Beckenham History

Railway stations in the London Borough of Bromley
Former South Eastern Railway (UK) stations
Railway stations in Great Britain opened in 1882
Railway stations served by Southeastern